Réseau de transport de Longueuil (RTL) is a public transit system in the city of Longueuil, Quebec, Canada, and nearby communities on the South Shore of Montreal. The RTL had an annual ridership of 34,447,686 in 2013.

History
RTL was officially inaugurated on July 1, 1974, as Commission de transport de la Rive-Sud de Montréal (CTRSM), replacing the former privately owned company Chambly Transport. It served the former communities of Boucherville, Brossard, Greenfield Park, Longueuil, LeMoyne, Saint-Hubert, Saint-Lambert and Notre-Dame-du-Sacré-Cœur (later annexed to Brossard in 1978). From 1985 until 2002 it was named Société de transport de la Rive-Sud de Montréal (STRSM). Following the municipal mergers in 2002, the name officially changed to Société de transport de Longueuil.  Its marketing name is Réseau de transport de Longueuil, to avoid confusion with the Société de transport de Laval.

Some of the "former" municipalities demerged (broke away) from the city of Longueuil on January 1, 2006, as the result of referendums. However, demerged municipalities continue to be served by and to contribute financially to the RTL, since they still belong to the urban agglomeration of Longueuil.

Bus stations served

Bus terminus 
 Terminus Brossard-Panama
 Terminus Centre-Ville
 Terminus Longueuil
 Terminus De Montarville
 Terminus Radisson

Park-and-ride lots 
 Brossard-Chevrier Park and Ride
 EXPRESS Chevrier/Exo Line 90 
 De Mortagne Park-n-Ride (Boucherville, rue Ampère, exit 92 off Autoroute 20)
 Exo Line 61
 Seigneurial Park-n-Ride (Saint-Bruno, corner boul. Seigneurial and Route 116)
 RTL Lines 98, 99, 192, 199

Individual Montreal metro stations 
 Bonaventure metro station accessed from Terminus Centre-Ville
 Longueuil–Université-de-Sherbrooke metro station accessed from Terminus Longueuil
 Papineau metro station
 Radisson metro station

Commuter rail stations along Mont-Saint-Hilaire line 
 Saint-Lambert Railway Station
 RTL Lines 1, 6, 55, 106
 Saint-Hubert Railway Station
 RTL Lines 8, 22, 28, 88
 Saint-Bruno Railway Station
 RTL Lines 91, 92

Routes

Shared taxi routes
The RTL provides 14 shared taxi routes for residents in certain sectors that are not served by regular bus routes. Shared taxis serve the same stops and accept the same tickets and passes as the bus service. Shared taxis take riders to the nearest transfer point. Each shared taxi route has its own schedule.

See also
 Réseau de transport métropolitain
 ARTM park and ride lots

References

External links

Exo (public transit)
Bus transport in Quebec
Transit agencies in Quebec
Transport in Longueuil
Transport in Boucherville
Transport in Brossard
Transport in Saint-Lambert, Quebec
1974 establishments in Quebec